William J. "Bill" Woodroffe (May 13, 1933 – September 26, 2003) was a political figure in New Brunswick, Canada. He represented Saint John East in the Legislative Assembly of New Brunswick from 1967 to 1978 as a Progressive Conservative member.

He was born in Saint John, New Brunswick, the son of Raymond Henry Woodroffe and Lilia Helen Sewell. In 1957, he married Doreen S. Mills. He had one son and two daughters. He served as a member of the Saint John City Council. Woodroffe was speaker for the provincial assembly from 1973 to 1978, during the Premiership of PC Richard Hatfield.

References 
 Canadian Parliamentary Guide, 1974, PG Normandin
 Legislative Assembly of New Brunswick

1933 births
2003 deaths
Progressive Conservative Party of New Brunswick MLAs
Saint John, New Brunswick city councillors
Speakers of the Legislative Assembly of New Brunswick